Pickering is a small lunar impact crater located to the northeast of the worn walled plain Hipparchus in the central region of the Moon. It was named after American astronomers Edward Charles Pickering and William Henry Pickering. It lies more than 25 km northeast of the crater Horrocks, which lies within Hipparchus. To the southeast is the lava-flooded Saunder.

Pickering is a bowl-shaped formation with a circular rim that has received little wear. It has a ray system that extends for about 160 kilometers.

Satellite craters 

By convention these features are identified on lunar maps by placing the letter on the side of the crater midpoint that is closest to Pickering.

See also 
 Asteroid 784 Pickeringia

References

External links

Pickering at The Moon Wiki

Impact craters on the Moon